Vieni via con me (Come away with me) is a TV programme presented by Fabio Fazio and Roberto Saviano, broadcast by the Italian public TV channel RAI Tre. The show ran on Monday evenings, from 8 November 2010 to 29 November 2010.

It received exceptional ratings in term of audience and critical response.

Episodes

References

External links
 "Vieni via con me" official site

Italian television shows
2010 Italian television series debuts
2010 Italian television series endings
2010s Italian television series
RAI original programming